Durovskaya is a rural locality (a village) in Kumzerskoye Rural Settlement, Kharovsky District, Vologda Oblast, Russia. The population was 13 as of 2002.

Geography 
Durovskaya is located 54 km northwest of Kharovsk (the district's administrative centre) by road. Pavshikha is the nearest rural locality.

References 

Rural localities in Kharovsky District